Those Dear Departed, also known as Ghosts Can Do It!, is a 1987 Australian black comedy film directed by Ted Robinson and starring Garry McDonald, Pamela Stephenson and Su Cruickshank.

Cast
Garry McDonald as Max Falcon
Pamela Stephenson as Marilyn Falcon
Su Cruickshank as Norda
Marian Dworakowski as Richard
Ritchie Singer as Gordon
John Clarke as Inspector Jerry
Jonathan Biggins as Sgt. Steve
Graeme Blundell as Dr. Howie

References

External links
Those Dear Departed at IMDb
Those Dear Departed at Oz Movies

Australian black comedy films
Films directed by Ted Robinson (TV director)
1980s English-language films
1980s Australian films